The third season of the American version of the television reality program Love Island premiered on CBS in the United States and CTV in Canada on July 7, 2021. Arielle Vandenberg returned to host the series while Matthew Hoffman provided voice-over narration. The season was filmed in a villa located in Nīnole, Hawaii.

It was the final season of Love Island to be aired on CBS before the series moved to Peacock in 2022.

Format

Love Island is a reality television program in which a group of contestants, who are referred to as "Islanders", are living in a villa in Hawaii. The Islanders are cut off from the outside world and are under constant video surveillance. To survive in the villa, the Islanders must be in a relationship with another Islander. The Islanders couple up for the first time on first impressions but they are later forced to "re-couple" at special ceremonies in which they can choose to remain with their current partners or to switch partners. At the villa, the couples must share a bed for sleeping and are permitted to talk with other Islanders at any time, allowing them to get to know everyone. While in the villa, each Islander has his or her own telephone, with which they can contact other Islanders via text and can receive text messages informing them of the latest challenges, dumpings, and re-couplings. While the Islanders might appear to have unmediated access to the outside world, they are limited in both their alcohol consumption and communication with the outside world. 

The Islanders are presented with many games and challenges that are designed to test their physical and mental abilities, after which the winners are sometimes presented with special prizes, such as a night at the Hideaway or a special date.

Islanders can be eliminated, or "dumped", for several reasons; these include remaining single after a re-coupling and by public vote through the Love Island mobile app. During the show's final week, members of the public vote to decide which couple should win the series; the couple who receive the most votes win.

At the envelope ceremony on finale night, the couple who received the highest number of votes from the public receive two envelopes, one for each partner. One envelope contains  and the other contains nothing. The partner with the  envelope may choose whether to share the money with his or her partner as a test of trust and commitment.

Islanders
The initial Islanders were revealed June 29, 2021. Initially, Tony "Ballo" Caraballo was announced as part of the cast entering for the Casa Amor twist, but was replaced by Kamryn "Kam" Mickens-Bennett the next day.

Future appearances
Trina Njoroge competed on the Paramount+ original series All Star Shore. Cashay Proudfoot, Javonny Vega, Melvin "Cinco" Holland, Jr. and Shannon St. Clair competed on The Challenge: USA. Olivia Kaiser competed on The Challenge: Ride or Dies

Coupling and elimination history

Notes

:  Cinco and Will entered after the initial coupling and were told that after twenty-four hours they'd be allowed to steal a girl from another guy.
:    America voted for the most compatible couples, with the three couples with the most votes being safe. The 3 saved couples then had to collectively save one more couple. The saved couples saved Cinco & Trina, leaving Aimee & Wes, Florita & Jeremy, and Olivia & Javonny vulnerable. The four saved boys then had to decide which vulnerable woman to save, choosing Olivia, and the 4 saved girls had to decide which vulnerable man to save, choosing Jeremy.
:  As the final part for the Casa Amor twist in week 4, Casa Amor and the villa held two separate re-coupling ceremonies for the original islanders to choose whether to return to their previous partner or pick any new partner. Any of the 10 new islanders that remained single by the end of either ceremony was dumped from the villa. However, if one of the 10 original islanders remained single at the end of both ceremonies, they would still remain in the villa, but as a single islander. Andrew, Gabe, Kam, Raul, Flo, Isabel, and Kay remained single at the end the night, and were all dumped from the villa.
:    America voted for their favorite girl and boy islanders, with the three girls and three boys with the most votes being safe. The 6 saved islanders then had to collectively save one more girl and boy islander. The saved girls saved Trina, while the saved boys saved Jeremy, leaving Cinco, Genevieve, Kyra, and Will vulnerable. The four saved girls then had to decide which vulnerable man to save, choosing Will, and the 4 saved boys had to decide which vulnerable woman to save, choosing Kyra.
:    America voted for the couple with most potential, with the three couples with the most votes being safe. The 3 saved couples then had to collectively save one more couple. The saved couples saved Bailey & Jeremy, leaving Alana & Charlie and Elly & K-Ci vulnerable. The four saved couples then had to decide which vulnerable couple to save, choosing Alana & Charlie.
: America voted for which couple they think should win Love Island. The couple with the most votes were declared the winners of Love Island and received the grand prize money.

Episodes

Production

Development 
CBS announced that Love Island had been renewed for a third season on January 27, 2021, with Vandenberg confirmed to return as host on the same day. On May 13, 2021, it was announced that the season would be premiering on July 7, 2021, after the premiere of the twenty-third season of Big Brother.

Casting 
In an effort to promote diversity, CBS announced a new rule for Love Island and other non-scripted reality television shows on the network, that 50% of all contestants must be a Person of Color or an Indigenous person for the 2021–2022 broadcast season. Along with Big Brother, Kassting, Inc. will no longer be providing casting services for the upcoming third season. Ally Capriotti Grant, an Emmy Award-winning casting director responsible for casting Queer Eye and previous Hell's Kitchen seasons, led the casting efforts for Love Island 3.

References

2021 American television seasons
Television shows filmed in Hawaii